Gorgani means "of or related to Gorgan", a city in north of Iran.
Gorgani language

Gorgani or Gurgani is a nisba that refers to the city of Gorgan (also known as "Astarabad" and "Jurjan"), and may refer to:

Fakhraddin Gorgani (fl. 1050), Persian poet
Rostam Gorgani, mid-16th century Persian physician who lived in India
Abul Qasim Gurgani, Sufi
Mohammad Alavi Gorgani, Iranian Twelver shi'a marja

See also
al-Jurjani
Astarabadi

Gorgani